Early to Bed is a 1928 silent short subject directed by Emmett J. Flynn starring comedy duo Laurel and Hardy. It was released by Metro-Goldwyn-Mayer on October 6, 1928.

Plot
The duo are homeless vagrants, until Ollie receives word that he has inherited a fortune from a deceased uncle. He buys a sumptuous mansion and makes Stan his butler. After a night of indulging in too much champagne, Ollie returns home intent on playing a series of cruel practical jokes on Stan. Stan retaliates by breaking nearly everything in the house.

Cast
Stan Laurel - The Butler
Oliver Hardy - The Master
Buster - house dog

References

External links 

 

1928 films
1928 comedy films
American silent short films
American black-and-white films
Films directed by Emmett J. Flynn
Laurel and Hardy (film series)
1928 short films
American comedy short films
1920s American films
Silent American comedy films
1920s English-language films